Simo Saloranta (12 December 1934 – 8 November 2017) was a Finnish long-distance runner. He competed in the 5000 metres at the 1960 Summer Olympics and the 1964 Summer Olympics.

References

1934 births
2017 deaths
Athletes (track and field) at the 1960 Summer Olympics
Athletes (track and field) at the 1964 Summer Olympics
Finnish male long-distance runners
Olympic athletes of Finland